Jan Zabrodsky (born 1 April 1952) is a Swedish former professional ice hockey and tennis player.

Biography
Zabrodsky was born in Prague in 1952. His father, Vladimír, was an ice hockey player for the Czechoslovakian national team, as well as a national Davis Cup representative. The family defected to Sweden in 1965.

In his early years, Zabrodsky played ice hockey, representing Skåne in the TV-pucken and Rögle BK at senior level. During his time at Rögle BK he played a season in Division 1 (1968-69). A forward, Zabrodsky signed with Djurgårdens IF for the 1970-71 season.

As a tennis player he had a best ranking of 217 in the world, with qualifying draw appearances at the French Open and Wimbledon. He had a win over Adriano Panatta at the Stockholm WCT tournament in 1975.

References

External links
 
 

1952 births
Living people
Swedish male tennis players
Swedish ice hockey forwards
Rögle BK players
Czechoslovak emigrants to Sweden
Sportspeople from Prague